The Pătac is a left tributary of the river Bâsca in Romania.

References

Rivers of Romania
Rivers of Buzău County